This is the list of cathedrals in Bulgaria sorted by denomination.

Eastern Orthodox
The following cathedrals of the Bulgarian Orthodox Church cathedrals are located in the Bulgaria:

Former cathedrals

Catholic

Latin Rite
The following are Latin Rite cathedrals and co-cathedrals of the Catholic Church in Bulgaria:

Eastern Rites
This cathedral belongs to the Bulgarian Greek Catholic Church:

See also
Lists of cathedrals by country
Orthodoxy in Bulgaria

References

Bulgaria
Cathedrals
Cathedrals